Umut Güzelses (born May 15, 1987) is a Turkish-Israeli footballer.

Childhood in Israel 
The Güzelses family are Sephardi Jews, descendants of refugees who fled the Spanish Inquisition. They emigrated to Israel when Umut was three years old, but found acclimation to be difficult.

Professional career in Israel 
Umut began his career with Israeli club Hapoel Tel Aviv. In order to keep his Turkish citizenship and avoid conscription in to the Israeli army, he joined the Turkish army for a term of three months.

Hapoel was reluctant to let him go after Umut's father said that he had an offer from a top flight Turkish club. It was only after Umut's father climbed on top of one of the floodlights at the club's training ground and threatened to jump, that Umut was released from his contract.

Professional career in Turkey
In 2005, Umut joined Turkish powerhouse Fenerbahçe. He made his debut in a match against Sivasspor on November 11, 2006. He was brought on in the 89th minute.

He is currently on loan with Maccabi Herzliya after being on loan with Hapoel Tel Aviv in the previous season. His contract with Fenerbahçe expires May 31, 2011.

Career notes
Umut signed a four-year contract with Fenerbahçe on 1 June 2007 and was subsequently loaned to Hapoel Tel Aviv. Umut chose to play for Turkey U21 and played against Albania on 17 January 2007 for U21 level.

Statistics

Footnotes

External links

1987 births
Living people
Footballers from Istanbul
Turkish footballers
Turkey under-21 international footballers
Israeli footballers
Turkish emigrants to Israel
Turkish Jews
Israeli Jews
Jewish footballers
Fenerbahçe S.K. footballers
Hapoel Tel Aviv F.C. players
Maccabi Herzliya F.C. players
Süper Lig players
Israeli Premier League players
Liga Leumit players
Association football forwards
Israeli people of Turkish-Jewish descent